Lipinia subvittata, the striped lipinia, is a species of skink found in the Philippines and Sulawesi (Indonesia).

References

Lipinia
Reptiles of Indonesia
Reptiles of the Philippines
Reptiles of Sulawesi
Reptiles described in 1873
Taxa named by Albert Günther